Tunde Kelani (born 26 February 1948), popularly known as TK, is a Nigerian filmmaker. In a career spanning more than four decades, TK specialises in producing movies that promote Nigeria's rich cultural heritage and have a root in documentation, archiving, education, entertainment and promotion of the culture.

He is also known for his love of adaptation of literary material into movies as most of his works have followed that style of filmmaking, including Ko se Gbe, O le ku, Thunder Bolt, The Narrow Path, White Handkerchief, Maami and Dazzling Mirage.

At an early age, he was sent to Abeokuta, to live with his grandparents. The rich Yoruba culture and tradition he experienced in his early years, coupled with the experience he garnered at the London Film School where he studied the art of filmmaking, prepared him for what he is doing today.

Early life
Tunde Kelani was born in Lagos but, at the age of five, he was sent to live with his grandparents at Abeokuta in Ogun State. He attended the Oke-Ona Primary School in Ikija, Abeokuta, and had his secondary school education at Abeokuta Grammar School. During this time, his grandfather was a chief (the Balogun of Ijaiye Kukudi) and he was privileged to have witnessed at close quarters most aspects of Yoruba ways of life, the Yoruba religion, Yoruba literature, Yoruba philosophy, Yoruba environments and the Yoruba world view in arts.

He was introduced to Yoruba literature from an early stage in his life and was also greatly influenced by theatre, as the Yorubas had a very strong travelling theatre tradition at that time. When he was in secondary school, he had the privilege to see most of the great Yoruba theatre classics, including The Palm-Wine Drinkard, Oba Koso, Kurunmi, Ogunde plays and more.

He became interested in photography from primary school dayss, and throughout his secondary-school education, he was actively investing money and taking to time to learn photography. So, inevitably, he became an apprentice photographer after he finished secondary school. Later, he trained at the then Western Nigeria Television (WNTV) and went on to attend the London Film School.

Early career
In the 1970s, Kelani worked as a BBC TV and Reuters correspondent, and in Nigerian TV. For Reuters he travelled to Ethiopia to cover the drought and to Zimbabwe three times to cover independence there. Once he finished from the London Film School, he returned to Nigeria and co-produced his first film with Adebayo Faleti, called The Dilemma of Rev. Father Michael (Idaamu Paadi Minkailu). Other co-producers include Alhaji Lasisi Oriekun, Wale Fanubi – his partner from Cinekraft, Yemi Farounbi and screenplay by Lola Fani-Kayode. Kelani has also worked on most feature films produced in Nigeria in his capacity as a cinematographer. Some of the 16mm feature films he worked on include: Anikura; Ogun Ajaye; Iya Ni Wura; Taxi Driver; Iwa and Fopomoyo. In 1990, Kelani was an assistant director and an actor in the 1990 film Mister Johnson, the first American film shot on location in Nigeria. Starring Pierce Brosnan and Maynard Eziashi, the film was based on a 1939 novel by Joyce Cary.

Literary adaptations
TK developed a soft spot for reading at a very young age and this later developed into his favourite pastime. Starting with the five works of D. O. Fagunwa, which include Igbo Olodumare, Ogboju Ode Ninu Igbo Irunmale, Aditu Olodumare, Irinkerindo Ninu Igbo Elegbeje and Ireke Onibudo, he immersed himself in any literal work he could get his hands on in both Yoruba and English language. Once he discovered the relationship between literature and drama, he adopted literary adaptations as a working model for his filmmaking. Not only does he love the books, he loves the authors too as he's always found hanging among them. His favourite writers include Kola Akinlade, Pa Amos Tutuola, Cyprian Ekwensi, Akinwunmi Ishola, Adebayo Faleti, Wale Ogunyemi and Wole Soyinka.

Some of his most successful films are literary adaptations and they include: Koseegbe, Oleku, Thunderbolt (Magun), The White Handkerchief, The Narrow Path, Maami and recently Dazzling Mirage. He has decided to maintain this model for his future films.

Production company
In 1991, Tunde Kelani started his own production company, Mainframe Films and Television Productions – Opomulero, so he could produce films and not just lend technical support. Having emerged from the world of theatre and literature, adaptations of books and plays for cinema are the core of Kelani's filmmaking practice and through them he celebrates writers and their work to what he sees as a public that reads less and less.

At Mainframe, he has produced movies such as Ti Oluwa Nile, Ayo Ni Mo Fe, Koseegbe, Oleku, Thunderbolt (Magun), Saworoide, Agogo Eewo, The Campus Queen, Abeni, Narrow Path, Arugba and Maami.

His latest work, Dazzling Mirage, an adaptation from a novel by Olayinka Egbokhare, is a love story about how a sickle-cell sufferer overcomes social stigma, prejudice and her own low self-esteem, to achieve success, marriage and motherhood. Through the movie, he hopes to bring much needed awareness and attention to the sickle-cell condition and help people make better informed decisions.

Filmography

See also
 List of Nigerian film producers

References

External links

Tunde Kelani Official website
Dazzling Mirage Official website
Academic analysis of Tunde Kelani's writings

1948 births
Living people
20th-century Nigerian businesspeople
21st-century Nigerian businesspeople
Actors from Ogun State
Alumni of the London Film School
Businesspeople from Lagos
Filmmakers from Lagos
Lifetime Achievement Award Africa Movie Academy Award winners
Nigerian cinematographers
Nigerian film directors
Nigerian film producers
Nigerian television company founders
Nigerian television producers
People educated at Abeokuta Grammar School
Yoruba people
Yoruba businesspeople
Yoruba filmmakers
Yoruba-language film directors